Philippines's 12th senatorial district, officially the Twelfth Senatorial District of the Philippine Islands, was one of the twelve senatorial districts of the Philippines in existence between 1916 and 1935. Unlike the first eleven districts which elected two members each to the Senate of the Philippines, the upper chamber of the bicameral Philippine Legislature under the Insular Government of the Philippine Islands, the two senators from this district were appointed by the Governor-General of the Philippines to serve indefinite terms in the 4th to 10th legislatures. The district was created under the 1916 Jones Law to represent the non-Christian tribes of the northern Luzon provinces of Mountain Province and Nueva Vizcaya, the city of Baguio, and the Moro people and other non-Christian tribes of the Department of Mindanao and Sulu provinces of Agusan, Bukidnon, Cotabato, Davao, Lanao, Sulu and Zamboanga.

The district was represented by a total of ten senators throughout its existence. It was abolished in 1935 when a unicameral National Assembly was installed under a new constitution following the passage of the Tydings–McDuffie Act which established the Commonwealth of the Philippines. Since the 1941 elections when the Senate was restored after a constitutional plebiscite, all twenty-four members of the upper house have been elected countrywide at-large. It was last represented by Datu Balabaran Sinsuat of the Nacionalista Demócrata Pro-Independencia and Juan Gaerlan of the Nacionalista Democrático.

List of senators

See also 
 Senatorial districts of the Philippines

References 

Senatorial districts of the Philippines
1916 establishments in the Philippines
1935 disestablishments in the Philippines
Politics of Baguio
Politics of Bukidnon
Politics of Cotabato
Politics of Mountain Province
Politics of Nueva Vizcaya
Politics of Sulu